SASC can refer to:
Small Arms School Corps
United States Senate Committee on Armed Services
South American Sailing Confederation
South Australian Supreme Court
Sydney Amateur Sailing Club